Citizens Co-op was a food cooperative, or a community owned market located in Gainesville, Florida. It closed in 2016 due to financial issues.

Origins 
Gretchen McIntyre, Elizabeth Nesbit, Wesley Hogan, Noah Shitama, and Matt Vargas signed the Articles of Incorporation on May 1, 2008.
Founders Elizabeth Nesbit and Gretchen McIntyre were separately inspired by co-ops in other cities: McInyre by a visit to a co-op in Asheville, N.C, and Nesbit by touring various US communities in search for a new home and discovering co-ops. After years of fundraising and spreading the word with events such as a benefit concert on April 25, 2009, and receiving the final push they needed on April 23, 2011, when they met their goal of raising $15,000 through  Kickstarter.com, Citizens Co-op held its grand opening on July 15, 2011.

Local Pledge and Sustainable Practice 
Citizens Co-op operated on a Local First policy by prioritizing their purchases from local and regional producers and
vendors whenever possible. Food and products grown and/or processed within 150 miles of Gainesville were considered local while the
borders of Mississippi, Tennessee, and North Carolina were considered within its region. In addition to
locale, they based their purchases on overall quality and freshness. Citizens Co-op was committed to building direct
relationships with their producers and showed preference for sustainably grown and produced goods.

Citizens Co-op aimed to provide a solution to food safety, environmental, industrial, and economical issues by promoting health and nutrition, increasing local jobs, providing naturally raised meats, allowing shoppers to support local economy, preserving seeds, maintaining low tillage and crop rotation, promoting biodiversity of species, and providing affordable organic food. Citizens Co-op supported local food from naturally grown, small-scale and family-farms and other local businesses to create a strong economic base in the community in order to move toward regional self-sufficiency. Citizen Co-op's model for business was based upon respect, mutuality, and cooperation; intentions of reaching out to the community in its entirety include offering financial options for lower income households, providing home delivery services for working families and elderly patrons, working with local non-profit organizations, schools, and other groups for productive social and environmental change, creating a distribution network for local farms to supply buyers with the freshest produce, and supplying a venue for any member to sell their goods in a supported marketplace. The co-op operated using environmentally sustainable processes such as solar panels, credits for reusing bags or containers, composting in-house waste, recycling, water conservation practices, and energy efficient lighting, heating, cooling, and equipment.

Operations 
Citizens Co-op was a legal entity in the State of Florida that was structured to operate as a cooperative. Its mission was to act as a local food grocer, educate consumers about their food, and to contribute to the local community.

Citizens Co-op offered certified organic groceries: vegetables, fruit and meat from local producers as well as other locally-made food and beauty products, supplemented by organic and fair-trade brand-name groceries and produce.

Another goal of the co-op was to promote a community centered on creative and sustainable business projects. Citizens Co-op aimed to provide a way to facilitate local eating, to ensure more money stayed in the community and supported Alachua farmers’ and neighbors’ livelihoods.

All profits were redistributed back to the development of the store and the community; any benefits were dispersed across the members who all own the business equally. Portions of these proceeds went to various projects, including "Porters Garden" (planting fruit trees), and "Citizens Cookbook" (with local recipes).

Membership 
Consumer members were partial owners and participated in the decision-making process for the business. To obtain this type of membership applications were necessary, along with payment.

Producer membership was for the suppliers of the co-op, i.e. small scale and family farms within 150 miles of Gainesville.

Employee membership was an option for employees at the co-op as a means of empowering them and rewarding good work.

Controversy 
In 2014, after the firing of two longstanding employees from the co-op, four employees unionized and were fired for using a co-op email list that informed the co-op members about their intention to unionize. The four unionized employees filed a complaint with the National Labor Relations Board. A year later, the co-op apologized for their actions after a final settlement agreement was reached between Citizens Co-op, the Gainesville Industrial Workers of the World and the National Labor Relations Board.

Closing
Citizens Co-op closed in 2016 due to financial issues. The general manager, Kim Drummond, said it never fully recovered from the customer boycotts related to the aforementioned labor disputes. The location and infighting between members were also cited as possible contributors for the store's demise.

See also
 List of food cooperatives

References 

Organizations based in Gainesville, Florida
Food cooperatives in the United States
Consumers' cooperatives in the United States